There is no recorded history of printed newspaper prior to Rana rule in Nepal. The first-hand press was imported by Jung Bahadur Rana after his visit to Europe, however it was used only after 58 years for printing. It was used to print religious books and government notices.

The first Nepali language newspaper named Gorkha Bharat Jeewan was published in 1886 BS from Banaras. It was a monthly paper edited by Ram Krishna Barma. However, the printed copies of this magazine has not been found yet. Sudha Sagar was the first media printed in Nepal. It was published monthly from Thahiti Kathmandu. It started in Shrawan, . It was edited by Pandit Naradev Pandey, Moti Krishna Sharma, and Kapil Dev. Sudha Sagar was discontinued shortly afterwards. In 1901, the same editor, Nardev and Moti, started Gorkhapatra though Pashupat press from Thahiti, Kathmandu.

Before Rana period
There is no recorded history of newspapers prior to the Rana rule.

During Rana rule
The list of newspaper published during the Rana rule are listed below:
 Sudha Sagar
 Gorkhapatra
 Sharada
 Udhyog
 Sahitya Shrot
 Gharelu Ilam Patrika
 Shikshya
 Kathmandu Municipal Patrika
 Nepal Shikshya
 Ankha
 Purusartha
 Jagaran Weekly
 Duniyakokhabar Weekly

After abolishment of Rana rule
There were about 170 newspapers prior to the Panchyat era and after the abolishment of Rana rule. Some of them are:
 Awaj was the first daily newspaper of Nepal. It was published in Falgun 8, 2007 BS, just one day after the establishment of democracy. It was published in Kathmandu. Gorkhapatra was published weekly at that time.
 Motherland, an English daily, was started in January 1958. It was discontinued in 1990

During Panchayat period
In the Panchayat era, newspaper were divided into either pro-Panchayat or anti Panchayat.
 Gorkhapatra became daily from 7 Falgun 2017 BS

Note: Popular newspapers such as Samaj daily, Chetana weekly, Motherland, Halkhabar, and Diyala were shut down in this period.

Democratic era
The constitution of Nepal 2047 BS, guaranteed press freedom and the right to information to people. The list of notable current newspaper is below.

Online-only

See also
 Media of Nepal
 Newari Newspaper

References

Nepal
Newspapers